The St. John Group is a geologic group in New Brunswick. It preserves fossils dating back to the Cambrian period.

See also

 List of fossiliferous stratigraphic units in New Brunswick

References
 

Cambrian New Brunswick